Five is a ballet made by Jean-Pierre Bonnefoux for New York City Ballet's American Music Festival to eponymous music by Charles Wuorinen commissioned for the occasion. The premiere took place on 28 April 1988 at the New York State Theater, Lincoln Center.

Original cast  
  
Maria Calegari

Jock Soto
Michael Byars
Damian Woetzel

Reviews  
"Dance; A Ballet by Bonnefoux With a Wuorinen Score", Anna Kisselgoff, April 30, 1988 NY Times

Articles 
  
May 22, 1988 Anna Kisselgoff, NY Times
 
January 3, 1996 Allan Kozinn, NY Times

Ballets by Jean-Pierre Bonnefoux
Ballets by Charles Wuorinen
1988 ballet premieres
New York City Ballet repertory
New York City Ballet American Music Festival
Serial compositions